Tatiana (Tatyana) Vasilyevna Doronina (born 12 September 1933) is a popular Soviet/Russian actress who has performed in movies and the theater. She is generally regarded as one of the most talented actresses of her generation and was named a People's Artist of the USSR in 1981.

Biography
Doronina was born in Leningrad, USSR (now present-day St. Petersburg Russia) After graduating the MKhAT school in Moscow, she returned to Leningrad and joined the Bolshoi Drama Theatre directed by Georgy Tovstonogov.

After moving to Moscow, Doronina worked at the Mayakovsky Theater and then at MKhAT.

The films she starred in, though few, are now considered Soviet classics. Many directors at the time believed she was too theatrical for film and refused to hire her. Georgy Natanson reversed that judgment by giving her the lead parts in Older Sister and Once More About Love. Both films had a significant success and made Doronina a noteworthy film star. Young women in the Soviet Union imitated her bouffant hair-do and her manner of speaking, and fans queued up for hours to get tickets. For her role for Once More about Love in which she played a flight attendant, she earned the Best Soviet Actress title in 1968 from the Soviet Screen. "Doronina's profoundly romantic heroines could sacrifice everything for love. She rendered the love theme the way no actress did. In almost every of her films she would sing a song, which in her presentation turned into a small drama", says Russian Cultural Navigator. In Three Poplars in Plyushcikha she plays a plain country woman who, although married, has never experienced love and puts the anguish tormenting her heart into a song called "Tenderness”.

Her former husbands include Edvard Radzinsky, a popular Russian writer and historian, and actors Oleg Basilashvili and Boris Khimichev.

Selected filmography
Movies
The First Echelon (1955) — Zoya
Soldiers Were Walking (1958) — Christia
Horizon (1961) — Klava, state farmer
An Uninvented Story (1964) — Klava Baidakova
Red Call (1965) — Nika
Working Village (1965) — Polina
Older Sister (1966) — Nadezhda, Lydia's older sister
Three Poplars in Plyushcikha (1968) — Nyura (Anna Grigoryevna)
Once More About Love (1968) — Natasha Alexandrova, flight attendant
Wonderful Character (1970) — Nadezhda Kazakova, singer from Siberia
Stepmom (1973) — Shura (Alexandra Nikolaevna) Olevantseva, Sveta's stepmother
To a Clear Fire (1975) — Anna Lavrentievna Kasyanova
Olga Sergeevna (1975) — Olga Sergeevna Vashkina, oceanologist
Capel (1981) — Maria, painter in the construction team, Vitka's mother
Valentin and Valentina (1985) — Mother of Valentina and Zhenya
Teleplays 

 The Enchanted Wanderer (1963) — Gypsy Pear
 Twenty Years Later (1971) — Queen Anne
 Dowry (1974) — Larisa Ogudalova
 Well, the Audience! (1976) — Lady, Voldemar's fellow traveler
 BDT Thirty Years Later (1986) — Cleopatra Lvovna Mamaeva
 Live and Remember (1987) — Nastya (Based on the novel by V. Rasputin)

Documentaries
 Today is the Premiere (1965)
 Live, Think, Feel, Love... Georgy Tovstonogov (1988) (Made by"Lentelefilm")
 The Face (1988) 
 Efim Kopelyan (1998) (From the series of TV programs of the ORT channel "To Remember")
 Boris Livanov (2003) (From the series of TV programs of the ORT channel "To Remember")
 The Appearance of the Master. Georgy Tovstonogov (2003) (TV channel “Russia-Culture”)
 Leonid Kharitonov. Sunny Boy (2004) (From the author's cycle by S. V. Ursulyak about the heroes of Soviet cinema)
 Boris Livanov (2005) (From the series of programs of the DTV channel "How the idols left")
 Drama by Ivan Brovkin (2006) 
 Demiurge. Georgy Tovstonogov (2008) (TV channel “Russia. Culture”)
 Innokenty Smoktunovsky Against Prince Myshkin (2008)
 Georgy Natanson. In Love With Cinema (2010)
 My Son — Andrei Krasko (2010)
 The Main Role for Your Favorite Actress (2011)
 Stepmother (2015) (From the cycle "Secrets of our cinema" on the TV Center TV channel)
Voicing 
 The Blue Bird (1970) — Fairy

Honours and awards
 Order of Merit for the Fatherland;
1st class (29 April 2019)
2nd class (13 September 2013)
3rd class (11 June 2003) - for outstanding contribution to the development of theatrical art
4th class (23 October 1998) - for many years of fruitful work in the field of theatrical art, and in connection with the 100th anniversary of the Moscow Art Theatre
 Order of Honour (8 September 2008) - for outstanding contribution to the development of domestic theatrical and cinematic arts, many years of creative activity
 Order of Friendship of Peoples (20 June 1994) - for great achievements in the field of theatrical arts
 Tsarskoselskaya Art Prize (18 October 2011 - "For the grace and inspiration of the images in the theatre and film"
 People's Artist of USSR
 People's Artist of the RSFSR
 Merited Artist of the RSFSR

References

External links

 Tatyana Doronina

1933 births
Living people
Soviet film actresses
Soviet stage actresses
Russian film actresses
Russian stage actresses
Actresses from Saint Petersburg
Russian  theatre directors
People's Artists of the USSR
Full Cavaliers of the Order "For Merit to the Fatherland"
Recipients of the Order of Honour (Russia)
Recipients of the Order of Friendship of Peoples
People's Artists of the RSFSR
Honored Artists of the RSFSR
Moscow Art Theatre School alumni